The 2018 Wisconsin Fall General Election was held in the U.S. state of Wisconsin on November 6, 2018. All of Wisconsin's partisan executive and administrative offices were up for election as well as one of Wisconsin's U.S. Senate seats, Wisconsin's eight seats in the United States House of Representatives, seventeen seats in the Wisconsin State Senate, and all 99 seats in the Wisconsin State Assembly.  The 2018 Wisconsin Fall Partisan Primary was held August 14, 2018.  There were also special elections held during 2018 for three State Assembly seats and two State Senate seats.

The Democrats swept in all of the fall elections for statewide officials, unseating three incumbent Republicans, including two-term Governor Scott Walker, and winning the open race for State Treasurer.  Republicans maintained control of both chambers in the Wisconsin Legislature however, as well as a majority of the state's U.S. House seats.

The 2018 Wisconsin Spring Election was held April 3, 2018.  This election featured a contested election for Wisconsin Supreme Court, as well as a referendum on an amendment to the Constitution of Wisconsin, and various other nonpartisan local and judicial races.  The 2018 Wisconsin Spring Primary was held on February 20, 2018.

In the nonpartisan Supreme Court election, the Wisconsin Democrats also claimed victory, as their preferred candidate defeated the Republicans' preferred candidate, reducing the Republican majority on the court to 4–3.

Federal

Senate

Incumbent Democrat Tammy Baldwin, first elected in 2012, won re-election to a second term by an 11 percentage point margin against Republican challenger Leah Vukmir. This was the widest margin of victory won by a statewide candidate in Wisconsin's 2018 elections, and marked the widest margin won by a U.S. Senate candidate in Wisconsin since Herb Kohl's landslide victory in the 2006 election.

House of Representatives

All 8 of Wisconsin's congressional districts were up for election in November. Seven incumbents ran for re-election, while the 1st district saw an open race after incumbent and then-Speaker of the House Paul Ryan announced his retirement. No seats flipped in the election, with Republicans continuing to hold 5 of the state's House seats to the Democrats' 3.

State

Executive
All of Wisconsin's executive offices saw close election results, with the largest vote difference in any race being eight-term incumbent Secretary of State Doug La Follette‘s 5.5 percent margin of victory. Every executive office was won by the Democratic candidate.

Governor

Incumbent Republican Governor Scott Walker, first elected in 2010, sought re-election to a third term. Despite having won two prior elections and a recall by fairly comfortable margins, Walker faced rising unpopularity due to his policies regarding infrastructure and education, among other issues, resulting in a close race. Low approval in Wisconsin of incumbent Republican U.S. President Donald Trump also harmed Walker in the election.

In the end, Walker was ultimately defeated by Democrat Tony Evers by a narrow one percent margin, ending 8 years of unified Republican control of the state.

Other candidates included Libertarian Phil Anderson and Independent Maggie Turnbull.

Lieutenant Governor

Former State Representative Mandela Barnes defeated incumbent Republican Lieutenant Governor Rebecca Kleefisch, who had served since 2010, and Libertarian Patrick Baird. Barnes became Wisconsin's first African-American Lieutenant Governor, and the second African-American ever elected to state office in Wisconsin.

Administrative

Attorney General 

Republican incumbent Brad Schimel, first elected in 2014, ran for re-election to a second term.  Voting rights attorney and former federal prosecutor Josh Kaul, the Democratic nominee, defeated Schimel in the general election. Terry Larson, the Constitution Party nominee, also garnered around 2% of the vote, greater than the vote difference between Schimel and Kaul.

Secretary of State

Incumbent Democrat Doug La Follette, first elected in 1982 (and also serving from 1975 to 1979), won re-election to a tenth non-consecutive term. Madison Alderwoman Arvina Martin challenged La Follette in the Democratic primary.

Jay Schroeder was nominated in the Republican primary to run against La Follette, pledging to abolish the position if elected.

Libertarian sports announcer Rich Reynolds declared his candidacy for the position as well, joining the "TeamGuv" bill with Phil Anderson and Patrick Baird.

Governing magazine projected the race as "safe Democratic".

Treasurer
Earlier in the year, a referendum had been held on whether or not to abolish the State Treasurer office, a move that Wisconsin voters rejected by a margin of more than 20 percent.

Incumbent Republican Matt Adamczyk, first elected in 2014, chose not to run for reelection. Sarah Godlewski, the Democratic nominee, defeated Republican Travis Hartwig in the general.

Legislature

State Senate

Two special elections had been held earlier in the year for the 1st and 10th districts. Both races were won by Democrats, despite the respective districts’ usual Republican leanings.

The 17 odd-numbered districts out of the 33 seats in the Wisconsin Senate were up for election in 2018, including the 1st district. In total, Republicans had 10 seats up for election, while Democrats had 7. André Jacque was able to win back the 1st district seat for Republicans from Democrat Caleb Frostman, who had defeated him in the June special election.

At the start of 2018, the senate had a composition of 18 Republicans and 13 Democrats with 2 vacancies.  The net result of all 2018 state senate elections was a gain of 1 seat for both parties.  When compared to the 2016 general election, however, the Republican majority was reduced from 20 to 13 (60.6%) to 19-14 (57.6%).

Summary

State Assembly

All 99 seats in the Wisconsin State Assembly were up for election in 2018. There were also two special elections for three Assembly vacancies during the course of 2018.  Republicans lost one seat to the Democrats in the 2018 general election, resulting a 63-36 seat Republican majority going into the 2019-2020 session.

Summary

Judiciary

State Supreme Court

There was an election for Wisconsin Supreme Court in 2018 to replace the retiring Justice Michael Gableman.

Candidates
Tim Burns, attorney
Rebecca Dallet, Milwaukee County circuit judge
Michael Screnock, Sauk County circuit judge

Results

State Court of Appeals
Two seats on the Wisconsin Court of Appeals were up for election in 2018, but both seats were uncontested.  
 In District I, Judge Timothy Dugan was elected to his first full term after being appointed by Governor Scott Walker in 2016. 
 In District IV, Judge JoAnne Kloppenburg was elected to her second six-year term.

State Circuit Courts
Fifty three of the state's 249 circuit court seats were up for election in 2018.  Eleven of those seats were contested.  Only one incumbent was defeated seeking re-election, Shaughnessy Murphy—an appointee of Governor Scott Walker in the Eau Claire Circuit.

Constitutional Amendment

In the Spring election, Wisconsin voters strongly rejected an amendment to the Constitution of Wisconsin which would have abolished the office of State Treasurer of Wisconsin.

County and city

Cannabis advisory questions 
Voters in eleven Wisconsin counties approved non-binding referendums expressing support for legalizing medical cannabis, and voters in six counties approved non-binding referendums expressing support for legalizing recreational cannabis.  The support for medical cannabis ranged from 67.1% in Clark County to 88.5% in Kenosha County, while support for recreational cannabis ranged from 60.2% in Racine county to 76.4% in Dane County.  The 16 counties that weighed in accounted for over half the state's population.

Post-Election

Accusations of Gerrymandering
In the weeks following the election, Wisconsin's legislative districts came under wide scrutiny as an example of gerrymandering due to the fact that while Republicans won a fairly wide majority in the Wisconsin State Assembly, the Democrats garnered nearly 9 percent more of the overall statewide vote. In addition, Wisconsin was notable for being the only state in the 2018 elections where Republicans won a majority of the state's seats in the U.S. House while Democrats won a majority of the overall votes.

Lame Duck Legislative Session
Early in December 2018, a special legislative session was called by outgoing Governor Scott Walker to pass a series of bills to limit the powers of Governor-elect Tony Evers, whom Walker had lost to in the election, as well as incoming State attorney general Josh Kaul.

Other bills being considered included restrictions on early voting and the passage of Medicaid work requirements, which Walker had previously held off on due to the election. A similar law restricting early voting that was passed several years prior had been ruled as unconstitutional.

The bills were widely denounced by Democrats and others as a “power grab.” Congresswoman Gwen Moore of Wisconsin's 4th district described the move as a “coup” that “hijacked the voters’ will.”  Lawsuits were filed by Evers and various labor unions almost immediately after Walker signed the bills into law.

See also
2018 United States elections
2016 Wisconsin elections
2018 Wisconsin gubernatorial election
2018 Wisconsin State Senate election
2018 Wisconsin State Assembly election

References

External links
Wisconsin Elections Commission official information for and about voters, elections and candidates
Candidates at Vote Smart  
Candidates at Ballotpedia 
Campaign finance at OpenSecrets

Official Attorney General campaign websites
Josh Kaul (D) for Attorney General
Terry Larson (C) for Attorney General
Brad Schimel (R) for Attorney General

Official Secretary of State campaign websites
Doug La Follette (D) for Secretary of State
Jay Schroeder (R) for Secretary of State

Official Treasurer campaign websites
Sarah Godlewski (D) for Treasurer
Travis Hartwig (R) for Treasurer

 
Wisconsin
Wisconsin State Legislature elections